Ruben Roosken (born 2 March 2000) is a Dutch professional footballer who plays as a left-back for Eerste Divisie club Heracles Almelo.

Club career

Emmen
The son of a Dutch father and a Luso-Angolan mother, Roosken played as a youth for VV Klazienaveen before joining the youth academy of FC Emmen. He made his Eredivisie debut for Emmen on 14 September 2019 in a match against Utrecht.

TOP Oss
On 10 August 2020, Roosken signed a two-year contract with Eerste Divisie club, TOP Oss. He made his debut for the club on 29 August in a 1–2 home loss to Helmond Sport, coming on as a substitute in the 67th minute for Niels Fleuren. In the following match against Roda JC Kerkrade, Roosken made his first start for the club. Afterwards, he would become a regular starter for the club, making 30 total appearances for TOP Oss as the club finished in 10th place.

Heracles Almelo
On 18 June 2021, it was announced that Roosken had signed a three-year contract with Heracles Almelo.

References

External links
 

2000 births
Living people
Dutch footballers
Dutch people of Angolan descent
Dutch people of Portuguese descent
Association football defenders
FC Emmen players
TOP Oss players
Heracles Almelo players
Eredivisie players
Eerste Divisie players